Midland County is a county located in the U.S. state of Texas. As of 2020, the population was 169,983. The county seat is Midland. The county is so named for being halfway (midway) between Fort Worth and El Paso on the Texas and Pacific Railway. Midland County is included in the Midland, TX Metropolitan Statistical Area as well as the Midland–Odessa Combined Statistical Area.

History
In 1968, the county lost before the Supreme Court in Avery v. Midland County which required local districts to be nearly equal. The city of Midland had most of the county's population but only elected one of the five county commissioners, which was found to violate the Fourteenth Amendment.

Geography
The Spraberry Trend, the third-largest oil field in the United States by remaining reserves, underlies much of the county.

Major highways

Adjacent counties
 Martin County (north)
 Glasscock County (east)
 Upton County (south)
 Ector County (west)
 Andrews County (northwest)
 Reagan County (southeast)

Demographics

Note: the US Census treats Hispanic/Latino as an ethnic category. This table excludes Latinos from the racial categories and assigns them to a separate category. Hispanics/Latinos can be of any race.

As of the census of 2000, there were 116,009 people, 42,745 households, and 30,947 families residing in the county. The population density was 129 people per square mile (50/km2). There were 48,060 housing units at an average density of 53 per square mile (21/km2). The racial makeup of the county was 77.32% White, 6.98% Black or African American, 0.64% Native American, 0.93% Asian, 0.03% Pacific Islander, 12.17% from other races, and 1.92% from two or more races. 29.03% of the population were Hispanic or Latino of any race.

There were 42,745 households, out of which 38.90% had children under the age of 18 living with them, 57.40% were married couples living together, 11.40% had a female householder with no husband present, and 27.60% were non-families. 24.20% of all households were made up of individuals, and 8.60% had someone living alone who was 65 years of age or older. The average household size was 2.68 and the average family size was 3.21.

In the county, the population was spread out, with 30.20% under the age of 18, 8.80% from 18 to 24, 28.40% from 25 to 44, 20.90% from 45 to 64, and 11.60% who were 65 years of age or older. The median age was 34 years. For every 100 females there were 93.40 males. For every 100 females age 18 and over, there were 89.40 males.

The median income for a household in the county was $39,082, and the median income for a family was $47,269. Males had a median income of $36,924 versus $24,708 for females. The per capita income for the county was $20,369. 12.90% of the population and 10.30% of families were below the poverty line. Out of the total people living in poverty, 16.20% are under the age of 18 and 7.90% are 65 or older.

Oil and gas industry
Midland County ranks #1 in the state of Texas for total oil production and #2 for total gas production. Oil and gas data from the Texas Railroad Commission reports 6,602 currently producing wells as of September 2020.

Politics
Midland County was one of the first areas of Texas to turn Republican. The last Democratic presidential candidate to win the county was Harry Truman in 1948. Even in the presidential election of 1964 in which the incumbent president, Texan Democrat Lyndon B. Johnson, won a national landslide victory, it gave 57.8% of its ballots to Republican presidential candidate and Arizona native Barry Goldwater. Midland County is located in Texas's 11th congressional district, represented by Republican August Pfluger. The 11th Congressional District gave George W. Bush 78% of its votes in 2004, higher than any other congressional district in the nation.

Communities

Cities
 Midland (county seat) (small part in Martin County)
 Odessa (partly in Ector County)

Unincorporated communities

 Chub
 Cotton Flat
 Greenwood
 Spraberry
 Terminal
 Valley View
 Warfield

Ghost towns
 Dameron City
 Germania
 Pleasant
 Prairie Lee
 Slaughter

Education
School districts:
 Midland Independent School District
 Greenwood Independent School District

Most areas in the county are within the service area of Midland College; however the Greenwood area is not within the Midland College service area.

See also

 List of museums in West Texas
 National Register of Historic Places listings in Midland County, Texas
 Recorded Texas Historic Landmarks in Midland County
 Gary Painter, sheriff of Midland County from 1985 until his death in 2019

References

External links

 Midland County government's website
 
 Midland County Profile of the Texas Association of Counties

 
1885 establishments in Texas
Populated places established in 1885
Majority-minority counties in Texas